Rock Castle, Virginia is a populated locality  in Goochland County, Virginia, United States of America.
"Rock Castle", an estate listed on the National Register of Historic Places is in located in  Rock Castle.

References

External links
 Rock Castle, Goochland County, Virginia from placenames.com

Populated places in Goochland County, Virginia